Stephanie Danler (born 1983) is an American author. Her debut novel, Sweetbitter (2016), was a New York Times bestseller and was adapted into a television show by the same name. She released a memoir, Stray, in 2020.

Life 
Danler grew up in Seal Beach, California. At age 16, she moved to Boulder, Colorado to live with her father. She attended Kenyon College in Ohio.

After moving to New York in 2006, Danler worked at Union Square Cafe for a year and earned an MFA in creative writing at the New School. She was working at Buvette, a restaurant in the West Village when she earned her first book deal.

In her early 30s, she moved to Los Angeles. As of May 2020, she was living in Silver Lake with her husband and son, and was expecting her second child.

Danler moved her family to Barcelona to work on Stray for a brief time, before returning to Los Angeles.

Writing career 
In 2014, Danler secured a six-figure, two-book publication deal with Knopf. She had sent her manuscript for Sweetbitter to an editor at Penguin  a regular customer at Buvette  who mentioned it to a colleague, who then acquired the book for Knopf.

Sweetbitter, a novel based on her experiences of working at Union Square Cafe, was published in 2016. It earned a starred review in Kirkus and was a New York Times bestseller. A review in The New Yorker said that "Danler deftly captures the unique power of hierarchy in the restaurant world, the role of drug and alcohol abuse, and the sense of borrowed grandeur that pervades the serving scene." A television adaptation (Sweetbitter), created by Danler, Stuart Zicherman, and Plan B Entertainment, premiered on Starz in 2018 and aired for two seasons.

In 2020, she published a memoir, Stray, about "familial dysfunction and addiction" and "the entanglement of love and disappointment." Kirkus called it a "mostly moving text in which writing is therapeutic and family trauma is useful material." A review in The New York Times described it as "carefully concocted but unfermented."

Works 
 Sweetbitter (2016) 
 Stray: A Memoir (2020)

References 

1983 births
Living people
Kenyon College alumni
The New School alumni
Writers from Manhattan
21st-century American women writers
21st-century American memoirists
American women memoirists
21st-century American novelists
American women novelists